Langset is a village in the municipality of Eidsvoll, Norway. It is located a few kilometres east of Minnesund, near the southern end of lake Mjøsa. Its population (2005) is 309.

References

Villages in Akershus